Söndags-Nisse (Swedish: Sunday Nisse) was a humor magazine published in Stockholm, Sweden. It was in circulation between 1863 and 1924.

History and profile
Söndags-Nisse was founded by Gustaf Wahlbom in 1862. The magazine contributed to the career of cartoonist Oskar Andersson who published comic strips in the magazine in 1897. Other contributors to the magazine include Carl Larsson and Jenny Nyström.

Grönköpings Veckoblad, a satirical political magazine, started as a section of Söndags-Nisse in 1902. Söndags-Nisse ceased publication in 1924.

Original drawing of Gustaf Wahlbom published in the magazine is archived in the national museum of Sweden.

References

External links

1862 establishments in Sweden
1924 disestablishments in Sweden
Defunct magazines published in Sweden
Humor magazines
Magazines established in 1862
Magazines disestablished in 1924
Magazines published in Stockholm
Swedish humour
Satirical magazines published in Sweden
Swedish-language magazines